Edith Prager (28 March 1922 – 14 March 2013) was an Austrian stage, and film actress. She later began a second career as a television presenter.

Selected filmography
 Kiss Me Casanova (1949)
 Good Fortune in Ohio (1950)
 1. April 2000 (1952)
 Herr Puntila and His Servant Matti (1955/1960)

References

Bibliography
 Goble, Alan. The Complete Index to Literary Sources in Film. Walter de Gruyter, 1999.

External links

1922 births
2013 deaths
Austrian film actresses
Austrian stage actresses
Actresses from Vienna